Siempre Contigo (English: Always with You) is 22nd studio album recorded by Mexican performer José José, It was released by RCA Ariola in late 1986 (see 1986 in music). It was produced by Spanish producer and guitarist Paco Cepero. This album became the third number-one set on the Billboard Latin Pop Albums by the artist and at the Grammy Awards of 1988 was nominated for Best Latin Pop Performance, losing to Un hombre solo by Julio Iglesias.

Track listing

Credits and personnel
Paco Cepero – Producer
Miguel Ángel Varona – Arranger

Chart performance

References

1986 albums
José José albums
RCA Records albums
Ariola Records albums
Spanish-language albums